The Faithful Hussar (German: Der treue Husar) is a 1954 West German comedy film directed by Rudolf Schündler and starring Paul Hörbiger, Loni Heuser and Harald Paulsen. It was shot at the Tempelhof Studios in West Berlin. The film's sets were designed by the art directors Willi A. Herrmann and Heinrich Weidemann. It takes its title from the traditional German song of the same title.

Synopsis
Sportswear salesman Eberhard Wacker is a member of a male choir known as The Faithful Hussar. Henpecked by his wife, he arranges to escape and have fun with his friends at a bar during carnival time. Before long their wives discover up their plans.

Cast
 Paul Hörbiger as Eberhard Wacker
 Loni Heuser as Ernestine Wacker
 Harry Meyen as 	Fred Wacker
 Harald Paulsen as Otto Kersten
 Ina Halley as 	Anita Kersten
 Doris Kirchner as 	Uschi Wagner
 Lucie Englisch as 	Resi Naderer
 Roland Kaiser as 	Kurtchen
 Die Dynamite-Cats as 	Kapelle
 Toby Fichelscher as 	Musik Leiter
 Wolf Gabbe as 	Singer
 Egon Kaiser as Kapelle
 Alice Treff as 	Liselotte seine Frau

References

Bibliography
 Judt, Tony. Postwar: A History of Europe Since 1945. Random House, 2011.

External links 
 

1954 films
1954 comedy films
German comedy films
West German films
1950s German-language films
Films directed by Rudolf Schündler
1950s German films
Films shot at Tempelhof Studios

de:Der treue Husar (Film)